The surname Royo may refer to:

 Andre Royo, American actor, producer, and writer
 Adela Ruiz de Royo, Spanish-born Panamanian mathematics academic and educator
 Ángel Royo, Spanish football manager
 Antonio Royo Marín, Spanish Dominican priest and theologian
 Aristides Royo, President of Panama 
 Josep Royo, Catalan contemporary artist
 Laura Royo, Spanish footballer
 Luis Royo, Spanish artist
 Manel Royo, Spanish footballer
 Manuela Royo Letelier, Chilean historian and lawyer
 Maria Alejandra Royo, Panamanian beauty pageant titleholder
 Reyna Royo, Panamanian model and beauty pageant contestant
 Romulo Royo, contemporary artist
 Rubén Royo, Spanish footballer

Spanish-language surnames